is an action role-playing simulation video game developed by Edelweiss and published by Marvelous. It was first released in North America on November 10, 2020 for the Nintendo Switch, PlayStation 4 and the PC through Steam. It was later released in Japan on November 12 and in Europe and Australia on November 20.

Gameplay

Players control the goddess Princess Sakuna, who is tasked with exploring the Isle of Demons and clearing it of monsters while also looking after a small group of human characters. The game is split between two separate gameplay styles: side scrolling hack and slash platforming levels that are gradually revealed on a map of the island as players complete objectives, and a farming simulator where the player must grow rice in a small paddy in the hamlet where Sakuna and the humans live. The side scrolling levels employ a 2.5D perspective, while exploring the hamlet and most rice farming tasks are done using a third person perspective from behind the player.

In the side scrolling levels, players explore and gather resources and use Sakuna's farming tools to fight demonic animals. Players can also grapple onto surfaces and zip about using a "divine raiment", a magical sash Sakuna wears that can extend to great lengths. The game features a day/night cycle, with enemies becoming more powerful and dangerous once night falls. At the end of the day, Sakuna can return to the hamlet and sit down to have dinner with the humans, eating a meal made using ingredients that the player has gathered. The meal restores Sakuna's health and stamina. Depending on the dishes served, the meal also activates certain abilities and provides various temporary buffs to Sakuna's stats for the next day. Sakuna can also ask the humans to help her gather resources, preserve ingredients for future consumption, and craft upgraded farming tools and clothing items.

Players cultivate rice through a process that takes place over several in-game seasons, with one season consisting of 3 in-game days. Growing rice requires multiple steps that take the form of several minigames which include tilling the field, planting the rice and adding fertilizer, and managing water levels and weeds before harvesting the rice and hulling it. Each rice harvest permanently increases Sakuna's stats, which players can further boost by improving the harvest's quality via careful management of their crop. Sakuna can save time by asking one of the humans to complete each rice farming task for her, though they will do so with less skill. By performing the tasks themselves, players will eventually unlock new abilities to make the process faster and more efficient.

Story

The game follows Princess Sakuna, a spoiled warrior and harvest goddess who is banished with her familiar Tama and a small band of humans to the Isle of Demons after the humans inadvertently enter the heavenly Lofty Realm, where the gods reside, and accidentally cause chaos while Sakuna tried to stop them. Unable to immediately send the humans back home, head goddess Lady Kamuhitsuki tasks Sakuna with looking after them while also clearing the island of demonic beasts before the time comes when she can send the humans back to their own world.

Development

Sakuna: Of Rice and Ruin was developed by Edelweiss, a two-man team who previously developed the 2014 shoot 'em up game Astebreed. The team began working on Sakuna in 2015. Before they decided to focus on the farming and fighting elements, the game was going to be a sequel to Edelweiss' earlier title Fairy Bloom Freesia.

With Sakuna the director Nal wanted to address the criticism of their previous games for their lack of length, world-building, and story; most of the development time was spent making the rice-harvesting simulation as realistic as possible. Koichi, an artist for the game, conducted research by growing rice on his balcony and reading about agriculture from public libraries (such as the National Diet Library) and archives in rural regions. To research traditional Japanese homes, he visited Kyoto and Shirakawa-go.

The game was first announced at E3 2017. It was originally scheduled to be released in 2019 but was delayed to 2020. Towards the end of the development more than ten people were working directly on the game. Edelweiss set an initial sales target of 30,000 copies sold.

According to Edelweiss, there are no plans for downloadable content for the game.

Reception

Sakuna: Of Rice and Ruin received generally favorable reviews according to the review aggregator Metacritic. It was a commercial success, with over 850,000 copies shipped by January 29, 2021. The game had sold 1 million copies by June 4, 2021.

Legacy
Edelweiss stated in January 2021 that they hope to create a sequel in the future.

In July 2021, three characters from Sakuna appear as Spirits in the crossover fighting game Super Smash Bros. Ultimate. In late August the same year, Sakuna's outfit was made available in a DLC collaboration with Story of Seasons: Pioneers of Olive Town. Sakuna will also appear in a collaboration with the 2021 rogue-lite action game Metallic Child.

A manga adaptation by Jiji & Pinch, titled Tensui no Sakuna Hime: Ikusa Datara no Kamigami, was serialized from November 26, 2021 to November 25, 2022 on Hero's Inc.'s Comiplex manga website.

See also
 Astebreed - an action shoot 'em up game developed by Edelweiss.

Notes

References

2020 video games
2021 manga
Action role-playing video games
Farming video games
Nintendo Switch games
PlayStation 4 games
Simulation video games
Single-player video games
Video games about demons
Video games based on Japanese mythology
Video games developed in Japan
Video games featuring female protagonists
Video games set in feudal Japan
Windows games
Xseed Games games